Xseed Games is an American video game company founded by former members of Square Enix USA. It later became a subsidiary of the Japanese game company Marvelous, providing the localization and publishing services for video games and related materials.

History
In 2007, AQ Interactive, Inc. announced the acquisition of Xseed Games, with share transfer before June. The deal was signed on April 24, and the share transfer was completed on June 26. Xseed Games joined the forces with Marvelous Entertainment (MMV) to co-publish their games in North America in 2008. At E3 2008, MMV USA and Xseed Games distinguished the games that would be co-published under the agreement and the games that Xseed would publish separately.

In 2009 on April 1, AQ Interactive announced increasing its stake of Xseed Games from 55% to 90% on the day of announcement. On April 14, Xseed Games announced its partnership with Japanese developer Nihon Falcom over localizing and publishing Ys Seven, Ys: The Oath in Felghana, Ys I & II Chronicles, and the Trails in the Sky trilogy for the PlayStation Portable in North America.

Xseed Games published Ys: The Oath in Felghana and Ys Origin on the Steam digital distribution platform in 2012 as their first release. In March 2013, Index Corporation's Atlus Online Division online business unit was purchased by Marvelous AQL and transferred to Xseed. Later on April 6, Xseed Games announced its business name was changed to Marvelous USA, Inc.

In 2019, former Xseed localization producer Brittany Avery discovered that she was not credited for her work on the enhanced PlayStation 4 port of The Legend of Heroes: Trails of Cold Steel after leaving the company the previous year. As a result, Xseed revealed their policy of not crediting staff members in games if they are no longer employed at the company at the time it releases. The practice, also done by some other companies in the industry, was widely criticized.

Games

Notes

References

External links
 

2004 establishments in California
2007 mergers and acquisitions
American companies established in 2004
American subsidiaries of foreign companies
Companies based in Torrance, California
Marvelous (company)
Video game companies established in 2004
Video game companies of the United States
Video game localization
Video game publishers